Abbey Home Media was a British home media distributor that released content aimed at children. It was founded in March 2002, as the successor company to Abbey Home Entertainment (AHE), which was acquired by the Just Group in 2000.

The company released content from production companies such as CBBC, CITV, CBeebies, LittleBe, Pop, Tiny Pop and Milkshake!. Abbey Home Media was also a producer of its own franchises, which included Bump the Elephant, Fun Song Factory, Wide-Eye and Baby Bright.

History and predecessors

Abbey Home Entertainment
Abbey Home Media's predecessor was Abbey Home Entertainment Group Limited (AHE), founded in 1989 by Ian and Anne Miles. AHE acquired the Tempo Video brand name from WM Collins Video in 1990 and introduced several brands:

Tempo Kids Club, used for re-releases of older Tempo Video releases which had been distributed by their previous owners, MSD Video and Collins Video.
Tempo Pre-School, used for releases aimed at very young children. The success of the releases made AHE the only video distributor whose releases were recommended and approved by the Pre-School Learning Alliance. The label remained after the Just Entertainment buyout (as a pre-school brand within Just) and was used in the Abbey Home Media era, before it was retired in favour of the regular Abbey Home Media brand in the mid-2000s.
Abbey Fitness, used for fitness releases.
Abbey Freetime, used for documentary releases.
Abbey Music, used for music and concert releases.

A subsidiary called Abbey Broadcast Communications produced original content for AHE on both VHS and audio cassette. This division became dormant in the early 2000s.

In 1995, PolyGram Filmed Entertainment acquired a 75% majority stake in the company. In 1998, the company was in talks to sell the stake back to Ian and Anne Miles and letting AHE trade independently again. In exchange, PolyGram would acquire the rights to distribute all future Fun Song Factory Videos.

In early 2000, AHE was acquired by Just Group PLC. Abbey's 'Tempo Pre-school' label was retained for pre-school products, while 'at school' video and audio products were released under the Just Entertainment label. Abbey itself retained its special focus on the 'pre-school' and 'at school' age groups.

Just Group PLC
Just Group PLC was a British holding company that focused on incorporating the creation and development of character concepts, ownership of intellectual property rights, and international licensing and distribution of character and corporate brand merchandise. The company had its shares listed on the Alternative Investment Market (AIM) of the London Stock Exchange and was based in the town of Bakewell, Derbyshire, England, with additional offices in London, New York, Hong Kong and Melbourne.

The company operated many subsidiaries:
 Just Licensing - licence holders for Just Group's properties.
 IPP - focused on licensed merchandise and based in the company's Hong Kong offices.
 Monster Innovations Group (MIG) - owned 50% of the "In my Pocket" trademark, which was acquired by Just in 1995.
 Wembley Sportsmaster Limited - acquired by Just in 1998; owned the "Wembley" football brand.

In the late 1990s, the company expanded into the entertainment industry and started producing animated television series. Its first series, Jellabies, proved sufficiently successful for CITV to commission a second series, which aired in 2000. The company expanded into to the toy and print industries by forming Jusco Toys and acquiring book publisher Burghley Publishing, later renamed Just Publishing. Just also signed a deal with Warner Bros. Consumer Products to produce products based on their properties and renew an existing magazine publishing deal.

In 1999, Just Group acquired Pinky & Perky for £500,000, with the intention of producing a new television series and expanding into the North American market. The company later signed a deal with Carlton Television subsidiary Planet 24 in July 2001 to create a stage show and comedy series oriented at an adult audience and titled Pinky & Perky in Sex 'n' Drugs 'n' Bacon Roll.

In 1999, the company acquired Abbey Home Entertainment for $2.1 Million, with the aim of focusing on the pre-school market. By the end of the year, the company had three shows in development: Wiki’s World, set for an autumn 2000 release; One Big Happy Family, set for release in 2001 as a co-production with Jellabies producer Optical Image; and Butt-Ugly Martians, a co-production with Mike Young Productions and DCDC, set for a September 2000 release. With the purchase, Just expanded into home video in the United Kingdom and began releasing Abbey's content under their own brand, retaining the Tempo Pre-School label for pre-school content.

In September 2000, Just fully acquired Optical Image for £1.5 Million. In December, Just Group acquired MediaKey plc for £7.2 Million.

In April 2001 it was confirmed that the company had failed to file accounts for the year. In August that year, the company laid off their CEO Wilf Shorrocks and commercial director Paula Shorrock and issued a shock profit warning. In the same month, the company showcased new projects at MIPCOM, including Wide-Eye, which was pre-sold to the BBC for delivery in autumn 2002, and several television specials. On October 16, Just closed their head office in Bakewell with the loss of 38 jobs, and was in talks on the sale of some non-core operations. The company also signed a deal with Universal Studios and subsidiary PolyGram Television to help manage Butt-Ugly Martians and allowing Universal to gain exclusive movie, home video (excluding Germany and the United Kingdom) and theme park rights to the property, as well as funding to produce more episodes. In November, the company's shares were suspended, due to lower-than-expected revenue from Butt-Ugly Martians and the failed purchase of MediaKey.

Just Group filed for administration on 9 January 2002 and the shares were delisted from Aim. Just Group PLC exited administration by the end of the year and was renamed Newscreen Media Group PLC.

In 2004, Newscreen Media Group filed for administration, and its assets were shared between them and another company called Think Entertainment PLC.

Tempo Video
Another predecessor of Abbey Home Media was Tempo Video, which was originally launched by video distributor MSD Video in 1987 as a kids-focused video label. After 2 years MSD transitioned the distribution of Tempo to Collins Video and then transitioned the label off to Abbey Home Entertainment within 1990, a year after the company was founded. Tempo Video was the mainstream video label for Abbey Home Entertainment and continued to be used until 2000, when the label was discontinued by AHE's new owner Just Group.

The Tempo label was also used within Abbey-distributed audio cassettes, under labels like Tempo Audio, Tempo Twins, Tempo Reed and Tempo Children's Classics.

Tempo DIC Video
Tempo Video was a joint venture with animation company DIC Enterprises. The label released DIC Entertainment programmes on VHS.

Abbey Home Media
After Just Group filed for administration in 2002, Ian Miles formed a new company under the Abbey name called Abbey Home Media on 4 March 2002, re-acquiring former assets once owned by AHE. Abbey Home Media retained the Tempo Pre-School brand that Just Group kept during their ownership of the Abbey brands and would later introduce the Tempo and Tempo TV Classics (Previously Tempo Classics) brands. During the 2010s, products were released under the regular Abbey Home Media brand name.

On 4 May 2020 it was confirmed that Anne Miles, the co-founder of Abbey, had died, a short while afterward, the company's website was shut down and their Facebook page confirmed that the company had ceased operations due to "uncertain circumstances", despite this, the company is still listed as "active" on Companies House until 13 December 2022 when Abbey was officially dissolved.

Properties owned by Abbey Home Media
Artyfacts
Anytime Tales
Baby Bright
Bump the Elephant
Butt-Ugly Martians
Fun Song Factory
MacDonald's Farm
Mr Men ABC: The Great Alphabet Hunt
Paddington's Alphabet Treasure Hunt
Postman Pat's ABC/123 Story/Read Along
SuperTed
Teddy Trucks
Wide-Eye

References

External links

Abbey Kids website

DVD companies of the United Kingdom
Home video companies established in 2002
Home video companies disestablished in 2022
2002 establishments in England
2022 disestablishments in England
Distribution companies of the United Kingdom
Entertainment companies of the United Kingdom
Home video distributors
Privately held companies based in London
Home video companies of the United Kingdom
Universal Pictures